Frank Walkley (October 17, 1921 – June 6, 2009) was an American politician who served in the New York State Assembly from 1965 to 1972.

References

1921 births
2009 deaths
Republican Party members of the New York State Assembly
20th-century American politicians